Abergeirw is a hamlet located in Gwynedd, North Wales.

The village of nine properties is located between Dolgellau and Trawsfynydd.

On 19 December 2008 National Grid plc connected it to the UK national electricity power grid, making it the last village in Wales to be supplied with mains electricity.

References

Villages in Gwynedd
Brithdir and Llanfachreth